Carnejy Antoine (born 27 July 1992) is a professional footballer who as a striker for Israeli Premier League club Hapoel Haifa. Born in France, he plays for the Haiti national team.

Club career

Noisy-le-Sec
Born in Paris 18e, Antoine began playing organized football with Olympique Noisy-le-Sec's academy at the age of 8, and began his senior career with the Eastern Paris club in 2011. In the 2012–13 season, his debut goal came during a 3-1 win against Oissel in the Championnat de France Amateur 2. He made 10 appearances as his side finished 10th in the group, barely avoiding relegation to Régional 1.

Bertrix
He spent his early career with semi-pro clubs in France and Belgium. He played for  RE Bertrix, AS Prix-lès-Mézières, FC Saint-Jean-le-Blanc, and Saint-Pryvé Saint-Hilaire FC. In 2013, he joined RE Bertrix of the Belgian Third Amateur Division. After appearing in 24 games, scoring 6 goals, he helped his team to again barely avoid the relegation playoffs, finishing 12th in the group.

At the end of the season, he left the club.

Saint-Jean-le-Blanc
After two years in the obscurity of the Régional 1 with AS Prix-lès-Mézières, he became a free agent in 2016 and eventually joined FC Saint-Jean-le-Blanc for the 2018–19 season.

He was a crucial starting player and their top scorer, scoring 18 in 23 matches as they finished rock-bottom of the table with 22 points.

Saint-Pryvé Saint-Hilaire
After just one season with Saint-Jean-le-Blanc, he joined Saint-Pryvé Saint-Hilaire FC. He was the joint top scorer at the 2019–20 Coupe de France with Pablo Sarabia.

Orléans
On 29 June 2020, he signed his first professional contract with Orléans in the Championnat National.

Casa Pia
On 19 January 2022, Antoine signed with Casa Pia in Portugal until the end of the 2022–23 season.

Hapoel Haifa
On 31 January 2023 signed for the Israeli Premier League club Hapoel Haifa.

International career
Born in France, Antoine is of Haitian descent. He was called up to represent the Haiti national team in June 2021. He debuted for Haiti in a 10–0 2022 FIFA World Cup qualification win over Turks and Caicos Islands on 5 June 2021, scoring a brace in his first start for the team.

Honours

Individual
Coupe de France joint top scorer: 2019–20

References

External links
 FDB Profile
 Foot National Profile

1991 births
Living people
Haitian footballers
Haitian expatriate footballers
Haiti international footballers
Citizens of Haiti through descent
Footballers from Paris
French footballers
French sportspeople of Haitian descent
Association football forwards
US Orléans players
Saint-Pryvé Saint-Hilaire FC players
Olympique Noisy-le-Sec players
Casa Pia A.C. players
Hapoel Haifa F.C. players
Championnat National players
Championnat National 2 players
Championnat National 3 players
Liga Portugal 2 players
Israeli Premier League players
2021 CONCACAF Gold Cup players
Expatriate footballers in Portugal
Expatriate footballers in Israel
Haitian expatriate sportspeople in Portugal
Haitian expatriate sportspeople in Israel